Archer Prewitt (born 1963 in Frankfort, Kentucky) is an American musician and cartoonist associated with the independent music scene in Chicago, Illinois.

Biography

Music 
Prewitt enrolled in the Kansas City Art Institute and began drumming in the band Tunnel Dogs and then Mudhead. Archer also played bass in Kansas City local favorites the Bangtails. A song by the Bangtails appears on the 2020 compilation Strum & Thrum: The American Jangle Underground 1983-1987. He then co-founded The Coctails, who moved from Kansas City to Chicago after their first album (1989) and went on to release six albums in all by the time they played their last show on New Year's Eve 1995/96.  By then Prewitt had also been involved with a new project, The Sea and Cake, who have released several critically acclaimed albums. Concomitant with his work in The Sea and Cake, Prewitt produced several solo releases.

Comics and illustration
In addition to his music, Prewitt is a freelance illustrator, cartoonist, and comic book colorist. His first professional illustrations were for the Kansas City Star while he still lived there. In 1992, he started drawing and self-publishing his Sof' Boy mini-comic, while also working as a colorist for Marvel Comics. Sof' Boy has subsequently been published by Kitchen Sink Press and Fantagraphics Books. Another Prewitt character is Funny Bunny, who has made several appearances in diverse publications, including Mome. Prewitt's work has appeared in Zero Zero, Drawn & Quarterly, Timothy McSweeney's Quarterly Concern, and BLAB!.

Prewitt was nominated for a 1998 Eisner Award for Best Colorist for the 1997 publication of Sof' Boy and Friends #1, published by Drawn & Quarterly.

Discography
In the Sun (Carrot Top Records / Hi-Ball Records, 1997)
White Sky (Carrot Top Records, 1999)
Gerroa Songs EP (Carrot Top Records, 2000)
Three (Thrill Jockey, 2002)
Wilderness (Thrill Jockey, 2005)

Bibliography
 "The City That Never Sleeps" (art only), Duplex Planet Illustrated #2 (Fantagraphics, April 1993)
 "Sof' Boy," Drawn & Quarterly #4 (Drawn & Quarterly, December 1995)
 Zero Zero #7, 8, 14 (Fantagraphics, 1996–1997)
 BLAB! #9 (Fantagraphics, 1997)
 BLAB! #10 (Fantagraphics, 1998)
 Sof' Boy & Friends #1–3 (Fantagraphics, 1997–2004)
 Timothy McSweeney's Quarterly Concern #13: "An Assorted Sampler of North American Comic Drawings, Strips, and Illustrated Stories, &c." (McSweeney's, spring 2004)

References

External links
 
[ Biography] at Allmusic.com
 Prewitt bio at Lambiek's Comiclopedia

1963 births
Living people
American cartoonists
American comics artists
Comics colorists
Musicians from Chicago
Artists from Chicago
People from Frankfort, Kentucky
Alternative cartoonists
Kansas City Art Institute alumni
Thrill Jockey artists
Rock musicians from Kentucky
The Sea and Cake members